Joel Cedergren (born 22 July 1974) is a Swedish football manager and former player who most recently managed GIF Sundsvall.

References

External links 
 

1974 births
Living people
Swedish footballers
GIF Sundsvall players
Swedish football managers
GIF Sundsvall managers
IK Brage players
Halmstads BK players
Sogndal Fotball players
Association football midfielders
IFK Mora Fotboll players
Allsvenskan players